Wang Quan'an (b. 1965) is a Sixth Generation Chinese film director. Wang was born in Yan'an, China. He graduated from the Beijing Film Academy in 1991. He had a ten-year relationship with actress and muse Yu Nan, which ended in 2009.

Career
Unlike many of his contemporaries, who focus on urban life, Wang's films have often emphasized China's rural life, including Jingzhe and Tuya's Marriage (2007). Wang's films have also often focused on female protagonists, including his first four films, who all starred actress Yu Nan. Wang's 2009 film, Weaving Girl took him to familiar territory, exploring working class female experiences in modern-day China.

Wang's most recent film, Apart Together—his first without Yu Nan in the starring role—follows an old Kuomintang soldier who returns to China from Taiwan after fifty years to find his first love. Apart Together opened the 2010 Berlin International Film Festival.

In 2011, Wang Quan'an and Zhang Yuqi had a whirlwind romance, and they married on April 18 of that year. Zhang announced they were divorced on July 2, 2015.

On 15 September 2014, Wang Quan'an and a woman were arrested in Beijing for prostitution.

Honors and awards
Since his debut film, Lunar Eclipse, in 1999, Wang has achieved success on the international film festival circuit. Most notably, he was awarded the prestigious Golden Bear at the 2007 Berlin International Film Festival for his film, Tuya's Marriage. The win was the third time a Chinese film had been awarded the Berlinale's top award, after Xie Fei's Woman Sesame Oil Maker and Zhang Yimou's debut film, Red Sorghum. He also won the Best Screenplay award for Apart Together at the 60th Berlin International Film Festival with co-writer Jin Na. The award was presented to him on stage by jury member and former partner Yu Nan.

In February 2017, Wang was a member of the jury for the 2017 Berlin Film Festival.

Filmography

As director

Notes

External links
 
 Wang Quan'an at Cinemasie.com
 Wang Quan'an at the Chinese Movie Database

Film directors from Shaanxi
Writers from Yan'an
Beijing Film Academy alumni
1965 births
Living people
Screenwriters from Shaanxi
Directors of Golden Bear winners
Silver Bear for Best Screenplay winners